International Conference on Differential Geometric Methods in Theoretical Physics are congresses held every few years on the subject of Differential geometric methods in Theoretical physics. Lectures, seminars, and discussions are held in different universities throughout the world, every few years, and a book compilation is published thereafter consisting of the papers submitted and discussed at the conference.

Works

1981
Conference on Differential Geometric Methods in Theoretical Physics
International Centre for Theoretical Physics, Trieste, 30 June-3 July 1981
by G. Denardo;  H. D. Doebner;  International Centre for Theoretical Physics.
Type:	Book
Language:	English
Publisher:	Singapore : World Scientific, ©1983.

OCLC: 9738857

13th
International Conference on Differential Geometric Methods in Theoretical Physics
Proceedings of the XIII International Conference on Differential Geometric Methods in Theoretical Physics
[eds.] Heinz Dietrich Doebner, Tchavdar D. Palev
(13th: 1984: Shumen, Bulgaria)
(Singapore: World Scientific, 1986)

14th
International Conference on Differential Geometric Methods in Mathematical Physics
Proceedings of the 14th International Conference on Differential Geometric Methods in Theoretical Physics held in Salamanca, Spain, June 24–29, 1985
edited by Pedro Luis García Pérez and A. Pérez-Rendón
(14th: 1985: Salamanca, Spain)
(Berlin ; New York: Springer-Verlag, 1987)
Notes: Series: Lecture Notes in Mathematics (Springer-Verlag); 1251

15th
International Conference on Differential Geometric Methods in Theoretical Physics
Proceedings of the XV International Conference on Differential Geometric Methods in Theoretical Physics
edited by H.D. Doebner, J.D. Hennig
(15th: 1986: Clausthal-Zellerfeld, Germany)
(Singapore: World Scientific, 1987)

16th
International Conference on Differential Geometrical Methods in Theoretical Physics
Proceedings of the NATO Advanced Research Workshop and the 16th International Conference on Differential Geometrical Methods in Theoretical Physics
edited by K. Bleuler, M. Werner
(16th: 1987: Como, Italy)
(Dordrecht; Boston :Kluwer Academic Publishers, 1988)

Notes: "Proceedings of the NATO Advanced Research Workshop and the 16th International Conference on Differential Geometrical Methods in Theoretical Physics, Como, Italy, 24–29 August 1987"--T.p. verso.

17th
Proceedings of the XVII International Conference on Differential Geometric Methods in Theoretical Physics
Chester, England 15–19 August 1988
by Allan I. Solomon
Type:	Book
Language:	English
Publisher:	Singapore ; Teaneck, N.J. : World Scientific, ©1989.

OCLC:	123106675

18th
International Conference on Differential Geometric Methods in Theoretical Physics: Physics and Geometry
Differential Geometric Methods in Theoretical Physics: Physics and Geometry
Proceedings of the NATO Advanced Research Workshop and the 18th International Conference on Differential Geometric Methods in Theoretical Physics: Physics and Geometry
(18th: 1988: University of California, Davis)
edited by Ling-Lie Chau and Werner Nahm
North Atlantic Treaty Organization. Scientific Affairs Division.
(New York: Plenum Press, 1990)

Notes: "Proceedings of the NATO Advanced Research Workshop and the 18th International Conference on Differential Geometric Methods in Theoretical Physics: Physics and Geometry, held July 2–8, 1988, at the University of California, Davis , Davis, California"--T.p. verso.
"Published in cooperation with NATO Scientific Affairs Division."

19th
International Conference on Differential Geometric Methods in Theoretical Physics
Differential Geometric Methods in Theoretical Physics
Proceedings of the 19th International Conference held in Rapallo, Italy, 19–24 June 1990
(19th: 1990: Rapallo, Italy)
eds. Claudio Bartocci, Ugo Bruzzo, Roberto Cianci
(Berlin; New York: Springer-Verlag, 1991

Notes: Papers from the 19th International Conference on Differential Geometric Methods in Theoretical Physics.

20th
International Conference on Differential Geometric Methods in Theoretical Physics
Proceedings of the Xxth International Conference on Differential Geometric Methods in Theoretical Physics, June 3–7, 1991, New York City, USA
eds. Sultan Catto, Alvany Rocha
(World Scientific Pub. Co., Inc., 1992)

21st
International Conference on Differential Geometric Methods in Theoretical Physics
Proceedings of the XXI International Conference on Differential Geometric Methods in Theoretical Physics: Tianjin, China, 5–9 June 1992
(21st: 1992: Tianjin, China)
editors, Chen Ning Yang, Mo-Lin Ge, X.W. Zhou
Related name: Hsing-wei Chou
(Singapore; River Edge, NJ: World Scientific, 1993)

22nd
Proceedings of the XXIIth International Conference on Differential Geometric Methods in Theoretical Physics
Ixtapa-Zihuatanejo, México, September 20–24, 1993
by J. Keller;  Zbigniew Oziewicz
Type:	Book
Language:	English
Publisher:	México, D.F. : Universidad Nacional Autónoma de México, ©1994.

OCLC: 32555470

23rd
Differential Geometry and Physics:
Proceedings of the 23rd International Conference of Differential Geometric Methods in Theoretical Physics
(Nankai Tracts in Mathematics)
eds. Mo-Lin Ge and Weiping Zhang
(World Scientific Publishing Company (December 30, 2006))

Mathematics conferences
Physics conferences